Ariella is the female version of the gender neutral Hebrew name Arie. Ariela is an alternative spelling. Ariel means "Lion of God" in Hebrew (MALE). Ariella means 'Lioness of God'in Hebrew (FEMALE) Ariella may refer to:

Ariella I of Furstan-Festil, sister and lover of King Imre in the Deryni novels by Katherine Kurtz
Ariella Kaeslin (born 1987), Swiss artistic gymnast
Supergirl (Ariella Kent), the Supergirl of the 853rd century
Ariela Massotti (born 1985), Brazilian actress
Ariella Rush (born 1956), American professional ballroom dancer

See also
Arella
Ariel (disambiguation)
Arielle (disambiguation)
Arielli
Uriella

Feminine given names